A. V. Anand (born 16 April 1936) is a Carnatic musician and mridangam player. Anand was taught to play mridangam by ghatam player K. S. Manjunath from a young age and has worked as an accompanist for Carnatic musicians, including Chowdiah, Chembai, T. R. Mahalingam, S. Balachander. and Doraiswamy Iyengar, since the 1950s.

Vidwan AV Anand has Presided over the 41st Music conference held by Bangalore Gayana Samaja,  from 5–11 October 2009.

Awards and honors
Naada Nidhi by Avadhoota Datta Peetham, Mysore
Sangeetha Kala Ratna by the Bangalore Gayana Samaja, a Carnatic music organization, in 2009.
Karnataka Kalashree
Guru Kala Bhushana
Honorary performance

References

1936 births
Carnatic instrumentalists
Living people
Mridangam players
Musicians from Bangalore
20th-century Indian musicians
20th-century drummers